Dim Zelleh (also Romanized as Dīm Z̧elleh and Dīm Z̄elleh) is a village in Mahur Rural District, Mahvarmilani District, Mamasani County, Fars Province, Iran. At the 2006 census, its population was 45, in 7 families.

References 

Populated places in Mamasani County